Sioux Empire College, also known as SEC0, was a community college located near the north side of the town of Hawarden in Sioux County, Iowa.  The school was founded in 1965; and, first semester was held in the fall of 1967.  The college was closed in May 1985.

References

External links
Entry on Higher Learning Commission website.
Sioux Empire College Becomes a Reality
SECO: The Final Chapter
Official Iowa Register 1973-1974

Educational institutions established in 1965
Community colleges in Iowa
Defunct universities and colleges in Iowa
Education in Sioux County, Iowa
Sioux Empire College
1965 establishments in Iowa
1985 disestablishments in Iowa